Kevin Harris (born November 17, 2000) is an American football running back for the New England Patriots of the National Football League (NFL). He played college football at South Carolina.

Early life and high school
Harris grew up in Hinesville, Georgia and attended Bradwell Institute. He was named the Georgia Region 2-6A Player of the Year after rushing for 1,680 yards and 16 touchdowns in his junior year. As a senior, Harris rushed for 1,556 yards and 22 touchdowns and was named the Region 2-6A Player of the Year for the second straight season. Harris committed to play college football at South Carolina over offers from Army, Air Force, Navy, Cornell, Furman, The Citadel, Middle Tennessee State, Tulane and Wofford.

College career
Harris rushed 21 times for 179 yards and four touchdowns as a true freshman. He was named the Gamecocks starting running back several weeks into his sophomore season. Against Ole Miss, Harris rushed for 243 yards, the fifth most in school history, and five touchdowns. He finished the season with 1,138 yards and 15 touchdowns on 185 carries and caught 21 passes for 159 yards and one touchdown.

Professional career

Harris was drafted by the New England Patriots in the sixth round, 183rd overall, in the 2022 NFL Draft. He was waived on August 30, 2022, and signed to the practice squad the next day. He was promoted to the active roster on October 13, 2022. In Week 14 against the Arizona Cardinals, he had his first professional touchdown on a 14-yard rush in the 27–13 victory. He appeared in five games as a rookie. He finished with 18 carries for 52 rushing yards and one rushing touchdown.

References

External links
 New England Patriots bio
South Carolina Gamecocks bio

Living people
American football running backs
South Carolina Gamecocks football players
Players of American football from Georgia (U.S. state)
People from Hinesville, Georgia
African-American players of American football
21st-century African-American sportspeople
2000 births
New England Patriots players